David Walker Benjamin Barton (1801 – July 7, 1863) was an American politician.

Life
Barton graduated from Yale College in 1821.  He was a lawyer by profession, and had been a member of the Virginia Legislature. He was an earnest opponent of the southern secession, and his death is said to have been occasioned by the domestic distress which the American Civil War produced.  He died in Winchester, Virginia, July 1863, aged about 61 years.

References

Attribution

External links

1863 deaths
Virginia lawyers
Members of the Virginia General Assembly
Yale College alumni
1801 births
19th-century American politicians
19th-century American lawyers
Southern Unionists in the American Civil War